JSW Ratnagiri Power Station is a coal-based thermal power plant located in Nandiwade village near Jaigad in Ratnagiri district Maharashtra. The power plant is operated by the JSW Energy Limited (JSWEL).

The coal for the plant is imported.

Capacity
It has an installed capacity of 1200 MW (4x300 MW). The plant became fully operational in year 2011.

References

Coal-fired power stations in Maharashtra
Ratnagiri district
JSW Energy
Year of establishment missing
2011 establishments in Maharashtra